Kumanudi (Serbian Cyrillic: Кумануди ) is a Serbian-Aromanian surname derived from the Vlach given name "Kuman". Notable people with the surname include:

Kosta Kumanudi (1874–1962), Serbian and Yugoslav politician

See also
Koumanoudi, Greek form

Serbian surnames